Justin Pekarek (born August 26, 1981) is an American former competitive ice dancer. With Jamie Silverstein, he is the 2000 Four Continents bronze medalist and 1999 World Junior champion.

Personal life 
Pekarek was born on August 26, 1981, in Valencia, California, the son of a General Motors executive. He and ice dancer Hilary Gibbons were married in January 2008, but had divorced by November 2016. Their son, Cooper Joseph, was born on September 1, 2011.

Pekarek has a Bachelor of Science degree in mechanical engineering from the University of Massachusetts Lowell and worked in plastics design before switching to a career as a real estate broker.

Career 
Silverstein and Pekarek won the 1999 World Junior and U.S. Junior titles.

The next season, Silverstein and Pekarek moved up to the senior level. They won gold at the 1999 Nebelhorn Trophy, silver at the 2000 U.S. Championships, and bronze at the 2000 Four Continents. They announced their split on January 10, 2001.

Pekarek teamed up with Hilary Gibbons for several years. They won bronze at the 2003 Karl Schäfer Memorial.

Pekarek coached and competed with the Theatre on Ice team Act I of Boston at the Skating Club of Boston.
He and Gibbons coached competitive ice dance teams to national titles at the juvenile, intermediate, and novice level.
Pekarek retired from coaching in 2008.

Programs 
(with Silverstein)

Competitive highlights 
GP: Grand Prix; JGP: Junior Series / Junior Grand Prix

With Gibbons

With Silverstein

References

External links

Navigation

1981 births
American male ice dancers
Living people
Sportspeople from Los Angeles County, California
Four Continents Figure Skating Championships medalists
World Junior Figure Skating Championships medalists
People from Valencia, Santa Clarita, California